Oman competed at the 1992 Summer Paralympics in Barcelona, Spain. 4 competitors from Oman won no medals and so did not place in the medal table.

See also 
 Oman at the Paralympics
 Oman at the 1992 Summer Olympics

References 

1992 in Omani sport
Nations at the 1992 Summer Paralympics